Geraldine Dondit (born 13 April 1976) is a former professional tennis player from Switzerland.

Biography
Dondit represented Switzerland in the Fed Cup from 1993 to 1995. She featured in a total of five ties, which included a World Group fixture in 1994. In a 1995 tie against Latvia, Dondit played a doubles rubber with a young Martina Hingis.

On the professional tour, she reached a top singles ranking of 269 in the world, with WTA Tour main-draw appearances at Lucerne in 1994 and Palermo in 1995.

She is now the tournament director of the WTA's Ladies Open Lugano and is a former personal assistant to Roger Federer.

ITF Circuit finals

Doubles: 1 (0–1)

See also
 List of Switzerland Fed Cup team representatives

References

External links
 
 
 

1976 births
Living people
Swiss female tennis players